The House of Colberg is an 1832 tragedy by the British writer Thomas James Serle. It premiered at the Theatre Royal, Drury Lane on 1 October 1832. The original cast included William Macready as Colberg, John Cooper as Prince of Eisbach, Thomas Cooke as the Chaplain, and Robert William Honner as Steinfeldt. The play was dedicated to the writer Thomas Talfourd.

References

Bibliography
 Downer, Alan Seymour. The Eminent Tragedian William Charles Macready. Harvard University Press, 1966. 
 Nicoll, Allardyce. A History of Early Nineteenth Century Drama 1800-1850. Cambridge University Press, 1930.

1832 plays
West End plays
British plays
Tragedy plays
Plays set in Germany